Ronnie Brown (born 1981) is an American football player.

Ronnie Brown may also refer to:

Ronnie Brown (footballer) (born 1944), English soccer player
Ronnie R. Brown (born 1946), Canadian poet
Ronnie Browne (born 1937), Scottish folk musician
Ronald Brown (mathematician) (born 1935), English mathematician

See also
Ronald Brown (disambiguation)